A bell is a directly struck idiophone percussion instrument. Most bells have the shape of a hollow cup that when struck vibrates in a single strong strike tone, with its sides forming an efficient resonator. The strike may be made by an internal "clapper" or "uvula", an external hammer, or—in small bells—by a small loose sphere enclosed within the body of the bell (jingle bell).

Bells are usually cast from bell metal (a type of bronze) for its resonant properties, but can also be made from other hard materials. This depends on the function. Some small bells such as ornamental bells or cowbells can be made from cast or pressed metal, glass or ceramic, but large bells such as a church, clock and tower bells are normally cast from bell metal.

Bells intended to be heard over a wide area can range from a single bell hung in a turret or bell-gable, to a musical ensemble such as an English ring of bells, a carillon or a Russian zvon which are tuned to a common scale and installed in a bell tower. Many public or institutional buildings house bells, most commonly as clock bells to sound the hours and quarters.

Historically, bells have been associated with religious rites, and are still used to call communities together for religious services. Later, bells were made to commemorate important events or people and have been associated with the concepts of peace and freedom. The study of bells is called campanology.

Etymology

Bell is a word common to the Low German dialects, cognate with Middle Low German  and Dutch  but not appearing among the other Germanic languages except the Icelandic  which was a loanword from Old English. It is popularly but not certainly related to the former sense of to bell ('to roar, to make a loud noise') which gave rise to bellow.

History 

The earliest archaeological evidence of bells dates from the 3rd millennium BC, and is traced to the Yangshao culture of Neolithic China. Clapper-bells made of pottery have been found in several archaeological sites. The pottery bells later developed into metal bells. In West Asia, the first bells appear in 1000 BC. The earliest metal bells, with one found in the Taosi site and four in the Erlitou site, are dated to about 2000 BC. With the emergence of other kinds of bells during the Shang Dynasty (c. 1600 – c. 1050 BC), they were relegated to subservient functions; at Shang and Zhou sites, they are also found as part of the horse-and-chariot gear and as collar-bells of dogs. By the 13th century BC, bells weighing over 150 kg were being cast in China. After 1000 AD, iron became the most commonly used metal for bells instead of bronze. The earliest dated iron bell was manufactured in 1079, found in Hubei Province.

Bells west of China did not reach the same size until the 2nd millennium AD. Assyrian bells dated to the 7th century BC were around 4 inches high. Roman bells dated to the 1st and 2nd century AD were around 8 inches high. The book of Exodus in the Bible notes that small gold bells were worn as ornaments on the hem of the robe of the high priest in Jerusalem. Among the ancient Greeks, handbells were used in camps and garrisons and by patrols that went around to visit sentinels. Among the Romans, the hour of bathing was announced by a bell. They also used them in the home, as an ornament and emblem, and bells were placed around the necks of cattle and sheep so they could be found if they strayed. As late as the 10th century AD, European bells were no higher than 2 feet in height.

Styles of ringing 

In the western world, the common form of bell is a church bell or town bell, which is hung within a tower or bell cote. Such bells are either fixed in a static position ("hung dead") or mounted on a beam (the "headstock") so they can swing to and fro. Bells that are hung dead are normally sounded by hitting the sound bow with a hammer or occasionally by pulling an internal clapper against the bell.

Where a bell is swung, it can either be swung over a small arc by a rope and lever or by using a rope on a wheel to swing the bell higher. As the bell swings higher the sound is projected outwards rather than downwards. Larger bells may be swung using electric motors. In some places, such as the Salzburg Cathedral, the clapper is held against the sound bow with an electric clasp as the bell swings up. The clasp would release the clapper to provide a cleaner start to ringing. To silence the bell, the clasp catches and locks the clapper back in place.

Bells hung for full circle ringing are swung through just over a complete circle from mouth uppermost. A stay (the wooden pole seen sticking up when the bells are down) engages a mechanism to allow the bell to rest just past its balance point. The rope is attached to one side of a wheel so that a different amount of rope is wound on and off as it swings to and fro. The bells are controlled by ringers (one to a bell) in a chamber below, who rotate the bell to through a full circle and back, and control the speed of oscillation when the bell is mouth upwards at the balance-point when little effort is required.

Swinging bells are sounded by an internal clapper. The clapper may have a longer period of swing than the bell. In this case, the bell will catch up with the clapper and if rung to or near full circle will carry the clapper up on the bell's trailing side. Alternatively, the clapper may have a shorter period and catch up with the bell's leading side, travel up with the bell coming to rest on the downhill side. This latter method is used in English style full circle ringing.

Occasionally the clappers have leather pads (called muffles) strapped around them to quieten the bells when practice ringing to avoid annoying the neighbourhood. Also at funerals, half-muffles are often used to give a full open sound on one round, and a muffled sound on the alternate round for a distinctive, mournful effect. This was done at the Funeral of Diana, Princess of Wales in 1997.

A carillon, which is a musical instrument consisting of at least 23 cast bronze cup-shaped bells, is tuned so that the bells can be played serially to produce a melody, or sounded together to play a chord. A traditional carillon is played by striking a baton keyboard with the fists, and by pressing the keys of a pedal keyboard with the feet. The keys mechanically activate levers and wires that connect to metal clappers that strike the inside of the bells, allowing the performer to vary the intensity of the note according to the force applied to the key.

Church and temple bells 

In the Eastern world, the traditional forms of bells are temple and palace bells, small ones being rung by a sharp rap with a stick, and very large ones rung by a blow from the outside by a large swinging beam. (See images of the great bell of Mii-dera below.)

The striking technique is employed worldwide for some of the largest tower-borne bells because swinging the bells themselves could damage their towers.

In the Roman Catholic Church and among some High Lutherans and Anglicans, small hand-held bells, called Sanctus or sacring bells, are often rung by a server at Mass when the priest holds high up first the host and then the chalice immediately after he has said the words of consecration over them (the moment known as the Elevation). This serves to indicate to the congregation that the bread and wine have just been transformed into the Body and Blood of Christ (see transubstantiation), or, in the alternative Reformation teaching, that Christ is now bodily present in the elements, and that what the priest is holding up for them to look at is Christ himself (see consubstantiation).

In Russian Orthodox bell ringing, the entire bell never moves, only the clapper. A complex system of ropes is developed and used uniquely for every bell tower. Some ropes (the smaller ones) are played by hand, the bigger ropes are played by foot.

Bells in Japanese religion 

Japanese Shintoist and Buddhist bells are used in religious ceremonies. Suzui, a homophone meaning both "cool" and "refreshing", are spherical bells which contain metal pellets that produce sound from the inside. The hemispherical bell is the Kane bell, which is struck on the outside. Large suspended temple bells are known as bonshō. (See also :ja:鈴, :ja:梵鐘).

Bells in Jainism, Buddhism and Hinduism 
Jain, Hindu and Buddhist bells, called "Ghanta" (IAST: Ghaṇṭā) in Sanskrit, are used in religious ceremonies. See also singing bowls. A bell hangs at the gate of many Hindu temples and is rung at the moment one enters the temple.

Bellfounding 

The process of casting bells is called bellfounding, and in Europe dates to the 4th or 5th century. The traditional metal for these bells is a bronze of about 23% tin. Known as bell metal, this alloy is also the traditional alloy for the finest Turkish and Chinese cymbals. Other materials sometimes used for large bells include brass and iron. Steel was tried during the busy church-building period of mid-19th-century England, because it was more economical than bronze, but was found not to be durable and manufacture ceased in the 1870s.

Casting
Small bells were originally made with the lost wax process but large bells are cast mouth downwards by filling the air space in a two-part mould with molten metal. Such a mould has an outer section clamped to a base-plate on which an inner core has been constructed.

The core is built on the base-plate using porous materials such as coke or brick and then covered in loam well mixed with straw and horse manure. This is given a profile corresponding to the inside shape of the finished bell and dried with gentle heat. Graphite and whiting are applied to form the final, smooth surface.

The outside of the mould is made within a perforated cast-iron case, larger than the finished bell, containing the loam mixture which is shaped, dried and smoothed in the same way as the core. The case is inverted (mouth down), lowered over the core and clamped to the base plate. The clamped mould is supported, usually by being buried in a casting pit to bear the weight of metal and to allow even cooling.

Historically, before rail or road transport of large bells was possible, a "bell pit" was often dug in the grounds of the building where the bell was to be installed. Molten bell metal is poured into the mould through a box lined with foundry sand. The founder would bring his casting tools to the site, and a furnace would be built next to the pit.

Bell tuning

Large bells are generally around 80% copper and 20% tin (bell metal), which has been found empirically to give the most pleasant tone. However, the tone of a bell is mostly due to its shape. A bell is regarded as having a good tone when it's "in tune with itself". In western bell founding, this is known as "harmonic tuning" of a bell, which results in the bell's strongest harmonics being in harmony with each other and the strike note. This produces the brightest and purest sound, which is the attractive sound of a good bell. A huge amount of effort has been expended over the centuries in finding the shape which will produce the harmonically tuned bell.

The accompanying musical staves show the series of harmonics which are generated when a bell is struck. The Erfurt bell is notable that it although it is an old bell, it is harmonically tuned, but was not typical of its time. Pieter and François Hemony in the 17th century reliably cast many bells for carillons of unequalled quality of tuning for the time, but after their death, their guarded trade secrets were lost, and not until the 19th century were bells of comparable tuning quality cast. It was only in modern times that repeatable harmonic tuning using a known scientific basis was achieved. The main partials (or harmonics) of a well-tuned bell are:

 hum note (an octave below the named note)
 strike tone (also called tap note or named note)
 tierce (a minor third above named note)
 quint (a fifth above named note)
 nominal (an octave above named note)

Further, less-audible,  harmonics include the major third and a perfect fifth in the second octave above the named note.

This quest by various founders over centuries of bell founding has resulted in the development of an optimum profile for casting each size of a bell to give true harmonic tuning. Although bells are cast to accurate patterns, variations in casting mean that a final tuning is necessary as the shape of the bell is critical in producing the desired strike note and associated harmonics. Tuning is undertaken by clamping the bell on a large rotating table and using a cutting tool to remove metal. This is an iterative process in which metal is removed from certain parts of the bell to change certain harmonics. This process was made possible historically by the use of tuning forks to find sympathetic resonance on specific parts of a bell for the harmonic being tuned, but today electronic strobe tuners are normally used. To tune the strike note, the nominal or the strike note are tuned; the effect is usually the same because the nominal is one of the main partials that determines the tone of the strike note. The thickness of a church bell at its thickest part, called the "sound bow", is usually one thirteenth its diameter. If the bell is mounted as cast, it is called a "maiden bell".

Major third bell
The traditional harmonically tuned bell has a minor third as a main harmonic. On the theory that western music in major keys may sound better on bells with a major third as a harmonic, production of bells with major thirds was attempted in the 1980s. Scientists at the Technical University in Eindhoven, using computer modelling, produced bell profiles which were cast by the Eijsbouts Bellfoundry in the Netherlands. They were described as resembling old Coke bottles  in that they had a bulge around the middle; In 1999 a design without the bulge was announced. However, the major bell concept has found little favour, and minor third bells are almost universally cast today.

Use in clock chimes 

Bells are also associated with clocks, indicating the hour by the striking of bells. Indeed, the word clock comes from the Latin word Cloca, meaning bell. Bells in clock towers or bell towers can be heard over long distances, which was especially important in the time when clocks were too expensive for widespread ownership.

In the case of clock towers and grandfather clocks, a particular sequence of tones may be played to distinguish between the hour, half-hour, quarter-hour, or other intervals. One common pattern is called "Westminster Quarters," a sixteen-note pattern named after the Palace of Westminster which popularized it as the measure used by Big Ben.

Notable bells 

The Great Bell of Dhammazedi (1484) may have been the largest bell ever made. It was lost in a river in Burma after being removed from a temple by the Portuguese in 1608.
The Tsar Bell by the Motorin Bellfounders is the largest bell still in existence. It weighs , but it was never rung and broke in 1737. It is on display in Moscow, Russia, inside the Kremlin.
The Great Mingun Bell is the largest functioning bell. It is located in Mingun, Burma, and weighs .
 The Gotenba Bell is the largest functioning swinging bell, weighing . It is located in a tourist resort in Gotenba, Japan. Hung in a freestanding frame, it is rung by hand. It was cast by Eijsbouts in 2006.
The World Peace Bell was the largest functioning swinging bell until 2006. It is located in Newport, Kentucky, United States, and was cast by the Paccard Foundry of France.
The largest Bell of the People's Salvation Cathedral is the largest free-swinging church bell in the world, surpassing the Petersglocke of Cologne Cathedral. Weighing more than 25 tons, it was cast by the Grassmayr Bell Foundry on the 11th of November 2016 and has a height of 3,130 mm, thickness of 273 mm.
 The Bell of King Seongdeok is the largest extant bell in Korea. The full Korean name means "Sacred Bell of King Seongdeok the Great." It was also known as the Bell of Bongdeoksa Temple, where it was first housed. The bell weighs about 25 tons and was originally cast in 771 CE. It is now stored in the National Museum of Gyeongju.
Pummerin in Vienna's Stephansdom is the most famous bell in Austria and the fifth largest in the world.
The St. Petersglocke, in the local dialect of Cologne also called  ("fat Peter"), is a bell in Germany's Cologne Cathedral. It weighs 24 tons and was cast in 1922. It is the largest functioning free-swinging bell in the world that swings from its top. (The Gotenba Bell and the World Peace Bell swing around their center of gravity, which is more like turning than swinging. So, depending on the point of view, the St. Petersglocke may be considered the largest free-swinging bell in the world.)
Maria Dolens, the bell for the Fallen in Rovereto (Italy) weighs 22.6 tons.
The South West tower of St Paul's Cathedral in London, England, houses Great Paul, the second largest bell at 16.5 tons in the British Isles. One can hear Great Paul booming out over Ludgate Hill at 1300 every day.
 The Olympic Bell, commissioned and cast for the 2012 London Olympic Games, is the largest harmonically-tuned bell in the world.
Big Ben is the fourth-largest bell in the British Isles, after The Olympic Bell (used at the opening of the 2012 Olympic Games), Great Paul (St Paul's Cathedral, City of London) and Great George (Liverpool Cathedral). Big Ben is the hour bell of the Great Clock in the Elizabeth Tower (formerly called the Clock Tower) at the Palace of Westminster, the Houses of Parliament.
The Dom Tower in the city of Utrecht, the Netherlands, houses the Salvator, weighing 8.2 tons and cast in 1505 by Geert van Wou.
Great Tom is the bell that hangs in Tom Tower (designed by Christopher Wren) of Christ Church, Oxford.  It was cast in 1680 and weighs over 6 tons.  Great Tom is still rung 101 times at 21:05 every night to signify the 101 original scholars of the college.
The Liberty Bell is a  American bell of great historic significance, located in Philadelphia, Pennsylvania.  It previously hung in Independence Hall.
Sigismund is a 12 tonne bell in the Wawel Cathedral in Kraków, Poland, cast in 1520. It is rung only on very significant national occasions.
The Maria Gloriosa in Erfurt Cathedral, Germany was cast by Geert van Wou in 1497, weighs more than 12,500 kg (13 tons) and is the world's largest medieval free-swinging bell.
The Lutine Bell, is the ship's bell of the wrecked HMS Lutine, weighs  and bears the inscription "ST. JEAN – 1779". It rests in Lloyd's of London Underwriting Room where it used to be struck when news of an overdue ship arrived—once for the loss of a ship (i.e., bad news, last in 1979), and twice for her return (i.e., good news, last in 1989).
The tenor (heaviest bell) of the change-ringing peal at Liverpool Cathedral is the heaviest bell hung for full-circle ringing.

Usage as musical instruments 

Some bells are used as musical instruments, such as carillons, (clock) chimes, agogô, or ensembles of bell-players, called bell choirs, using hand-held bells of varying tones. A "ring of bells" is a set of four to twelve or more bells used in change ringing, a particular method of ringing bells in patterns. A peal in changing ringing may have bells playing for several hours, playing 5,000 or more patterns without a break or repetition. They have also been used in many kinds of popular music, such as in AC/DC's "Hells Bells" and Metallica's "For Whom the Bell Tolls".

Ancient Chinese bells 

The ancient Chinese bronze chime bells called bianzhong or zhong / zeng (鐘) were used as polyphonic musical instruments and some have been dated at between 2000 and 3600 years old. Tuned bells have been created and used for musical performance in many cultures but Zhong are unique among all other types of cast bells in several respects and they rank among the highest achievements of Chinese bronze casting technology. However, the remarkable secret of their design and the method of casting—known only to the Chinese in antiquity—was lost in later generations and was not fully rediscovered and understood until the 20th century.

In 1978 a complete ceremonial set of 65  Zhong bells was found in a near-perfect state of preservation during the excavation of the tomb of Marquis Yi, ruler of Zeng, one of the Warring States.  Their special shape gives them the ability to produce two different musical tones, depending on where they are struck. The interval between these notes on each bell is either a major or minor third, equivalent to a distance of four or five notes on a piano.

The bells of Marquis Yi—which were still fully playable after almost 2500 years—cover a range of slightly less than five octaves but thanks to their dual-tone capability, the set can sound a complete 12-tone scale—predating the development of the European 12-tone system by some 2000 years—and can play melodies in diatonic and pentatonic scales.

Another related ancient Chinese musical instrument is called qing (磬 pinyin qìng) but it was made of stone instead of metal.

In more recent times, the top of bells in China was usually decorated with a small dragon, known as pulao; the figure of the dragon served as a hook for hanging the bell.

Konguro'o
Konguro'o is a small bell which, like the Djalaajyn, was first used for utilitarian purposes and only later for artistic ones. Konguro'o rang when moving to new places. They were fastened to the horse harnesses and created a very specific "smart" sound background. Konguro'o also hung on the neck of the leader goat, which the sheep herd followed. This led to the association in folk memory between the distinctive sound of konguro'o and the nomadic way of life.

To make this instrument, Kyrgyz foremen used copper, bronze, iron and brass. They also decorated it with artistic carving and covered it with silver. Sizes of the instruments might vary within certain limits, what depended on its function. Every bell had its own timbre.

Chimes
A variant on the bell is the tubular bell. Several of these metal tubes which are struck manually with hammers, form an instrument named tubular bells or chimes. In the case of wind or aeolian chimes, the tubes are blown against one another by the wind.

Lithuanian Skrabalai
The skrabalai is a traditional folk instrument in Lithuania which consists of wooden bells of various sizes hanging in several vertical rows with one or two wooden or metal small clappers hanging inside them. It is played with two wooden sticks. When the skrabalai is moved a clapper knocks at the wall of the trough. The pitch of the sound depends on the size of the wooden trough. The instrument developed from wooden cowbells that shepherds would tie to cows' necks.

Farm bells 
Whereas the church and temple bells called to mass or religious service, bells were used on farms for more secular signalling. The greater farms in Scandinavia usually had a small bell-tower resting on the top of the barn. The bell was used to call the workers from the field at the end of the day's work.

In folk tradition, it is recorded that each church and possibly several farms had their specific rhymes connected to the sound of the specific bells. An example is the Pete Seeger and Idris Davies song "The Bells of Rhymney".

Dead bell
In Scotland, up until the nineteenth century, it was the tradition to ring a dead bell, a form of handbell, at the death of an individual and at the funeral.

Bell study and ringing organisations
The following organizations promote the ringing, study, music, collection, preservation and restoration of bells. Nation(s) covered are given in parenthesis.
The American Bell Association International (United States with foreign chapters)
The Australian and New Zealand Association of Bellringers (Australia, New Zealand)
Beratungsausschuss für das Deutsche Glockenwesen (Germany)
Central Council of Church Bell Ringers (worldwide) - promotes English style full circle change ringing
Handbell Musicians of America (United States) - formerly known as The American Guild of English Handbell Ringers (AGEHR)
Handbell Ringers of Great Britain (United Kingdom)
Société Française de Campanologie (France)
Associazione Italiana di Campanologia (Italy) - http://campanologia.org/
Verband Deutscher Glockengießereien e.V. (Germany)
Lietuvos kampanologų draugija "Societas campanarum Lituaniae" (Lithuania)
World Carillon Federation (multinational) - an international association of independent national or regional societies, https://www.carillon.org
Association Campanaire Wallonne asbl (Belgium/Wallonia) - http://www.campano.be/
British Carillon Society (Great Britain, Ireland, Northern Ireland) - https://www.britishcarillons.org
Carillon Society of Australia (Australia) - http://www.carillon.org.au/
Confraria de Campaners i Carillonistes de Catalunya (Catalonia) - http://campanes.cat/
Deutsche Glockenspiel Vereinigung (Germany) - https://glockenspieler.de/
The Guild of Carillonneurs in North America (Canada, Mexico, United States) - https://www.gcna.org
Guilde des Carillonneurs de France (France) - http://www.carillonneurs.fr/
Guilde des Carillonneurs et Campanologues Suisses (Switzerland) - http://www.campanae.ch/
Associazione Suonatori di Campane a Sistema Veronese (Italy) - https://www.campanesistemaveronese.it/
Koninklijke Nederlandse Klokkenspel-Vereniging (The Netherlands) - https://www.klokkenspel.org/
Lithuanian Carillonist Guild (Lithuania) - https://web.archive.org/web/20180911185748/http://www.carillon.lt/ last archived on 11 Sep 2018
Nordisk Selskap for Campanologi og Klokkespil (Denmark, Sweden, Norway, Finland, Iceland) - https://www.nsck.org/
Polskie Stowarzyszenie Carillonowe (Poland) - https://web.archive.org/web/20171101132723/http://www.carillon.pl/ last archived on 1 Nov 2017
Russian Carillon Foundation (Russia)
Vlaamse Beiaard Vereniging (Belgium/Flanders) - https://www.beiaard.org/

Gallery

See also 

 
 American Bell Association International
 Bell hanger
 Bellhop
 Bicycle bell
 Bermuda carriage bell
 Cat bell
 Cowbell
 Doorbell
 Division bell
 Electric bell
 Electronic tuners, used to tune bells
 Glockenspiel
 Handbell
 John Taylor Bellfounders
 School bell
 Ship's bell
 Suzu
 Train bell
 Veronese bellringing art
 Whitechapel Bell Foundry

References

Notes

Citations

Sources

Further reading

 Fadul, Jose A. Fadul's Encyclopedia of Bells. 2015. Lulu Press. 
 Murdoch, James. (1903). A History of Japan. London: Paul, Trech, Trubner. [re-issued by Routledge, London, 1996. 
 Ponsonby-Fane, Richard A. B. (1956). Kyoto: The Old Capital of Japan, 794–1869. Kyoto: The Ponsonby Memorial Society.
Spencer, Ann "And round me rings": bell tales and folklore. Toronto: Tundra, 2003 
 
 Willis, Stephen Charles. Bells through the Ages: from the Percival Price Collection = Les Cloches à travers les siècles: provenant du fonds Percival Price. Ottawa: National Library of Canada, 1986. 34 p., ill. with b&w photos. N.B.: Prepared on the occasion of an exhibition of the same title, based on the collection of bell and carillon related material and documentation, of former Dominion Carillonneur (of Canadian Parliament, Ottawa), Percival Price, held at the National Library of Canada (as then named), 12 May to 14 Sept. 1986; some copies come with the guide to the taped dubbings of the recordings played as background music to the displays, as technically prepared by Gilles Saint-Laurent and listed by Stephen Charles Willis, both of the library's Music Division; English and French texts respectively divided into upper and lower portions of each page.

External links 

 
 Tower Bells
 Bell recordings of the Basque Country
 'Bells in Aragón: a traditional means of communication' thesis (Spanish)
 Animation of English Full-circle ringing
 Videos of the London Olympic bell being cast, tuned and installed.

Articles containing video clips
Asian percussion instruments
 
Campanology
Chinese inventions
European percussion instruments
Hand percussion
Idiophones struck directly
Kyrgyz musical instruments
Percussion instruments used as both pitched and unpitched